Camila Alves McConaughey ( Alves; born 28 January 1983) is a Brazilian model and designer. She is married to American actor Matthew McConaughey.

Early life
Camila Alves was born in Itambacuri, Minas Gerais, Brazil, about 250 miles east of the provincial capital of Belo Horizonte and raised there until the age of 15. Her mother is an artist and designer, and her father, a ranch owner. At 15, Alves traveled to Los Angeles to visit her aunt and decided to stay, overstaying her visa and becoming an illegal immigrant. After working for four years as a house-cleaner and waitress, she became fluent in English and decided to make the United States her home.

Career
At the age of 19, Alves moved to New York City to pursue a career as a fashion model. Alves worked as a waitress and as a cleaner at one point. As a model, she has graced numerous magazine covers such as Ocean Drive, Brazilian edition of Men's Vogue, ES Magazine, Maxim, Town & Country, People and Bella. She has walked the runway at fashion shows for Valentino, Carolina Herrera, Mango, The Heart Truth's Red Dress Collection and TCN.

Alves and her mother design the Muxo line of handbags, developing their design after experimenting for three years with styles and designs. In 2010, Alves hosted the third season of the Bravo network reality television series Shear Genius. In April 2012, Alves was signed on as the new face for Macy's clothing line I.N.C. International Concepts.

In January 2016, Alves launched a lifestyle website, Women of Today, that serves as a hub for her social media; livestream video program, Camila's Code; and blog posts on food, health, crafts & décor, style, family, and work life. Alves is also the co-owner of the organic food company, Yummy Spoonfuls, which launched its product line for babies and toddlers in Target's frozen food section in 2016.

She co-hosted, with Eddie Jackson, the first season of the Food Network competition show Kids BBQ Championship, which aired in summer 2016.

Her children's book, Just Try One Bite, co-written with Adam Mansbach was released in on March 22, 2022 by Dial Books. The book landed on the New York Times Best Seller list.

Personal life

Alves met American actor Matthew McConaughey in 2006. The couple became engaged on Christmas Day in 2011 and were married in a private Catholic wedding ceremony on June 13, 2012, in Austin, Texas, where they reside. They have three children: a son born in July 2008, a daughter born in January 2010, and a second son born in December 2012. In 2021, McConaughey stated that meeting Alves inspired him to stop acting in rom-com movies.

On August 4, 2015, she became a U.S. citizen in the same naturalization ceremony as British actress Emily Blunt.

Philanthropy
Alves and McConaughey founded the Just Keep Livin' Foundation in 2010. The foundation was the focus of a partnership with fashion brand Veronica Beard in 2019.

In May 2020, during the coronavirus pandemic, McConaughey and Alves distributed over 100,000 face masks to hospitals in Texas.

Filmography

References

External links

J.K. livin foundation
Alves' Biography  at My Muxo Handcrafted Leather Handbags

1982 births
Living people
People from Belo Horizonte
Brazilian people of Portuguese descent
Brazilian television presenters
Brazilian female models
Brazilian fashion designers
Brazilian expatriates in the United States
People from Austin, Texas
Brazilian women television presenters
Naturalized citizens of the United States
Brazilian women fashion designers
21st-century Brazilian women